The Fraser Album is a collection of paintings commissioned by British Indian civil servant, William Fraser. It is considered among the greatest masterpieces of Company painting. This work is an important documentation of the Mughal empire towards its end.

The artwork covered the life in Mughal era during the time. It compendium has portraits of villagers, soldiers, holy men, dancing women, Afghan horse-dealers, ascetics, village of Rania and Indian nobles. Some of the noted Mughal painters like Ghulam Ali Khan, his brother Faiz, and family worked on the Fraser Album, after financial support from the Mughal emperor diminished.

There are over 90 paintings and drawings in the album, which came to light in Fraser's papers only in 1979. Most were painted between 1815 to 1819. They are now dispersed.

Artworks

See also
 Delhi Book

References

Delhi
Mughal art